The Amrokkang Line is a non-electrified freight-only railway line of the Korean State Railway in North P'yŏngan Province, North Korea, running from Pup'ung on the P'yŏngbuk Line to Amrokkang Station on the Yalu River.

History
Originally called the Sup'ung Hoan Line, it was opened by the P'yŏngbuk Railway on 30 September 1940.

Following the partition of Korea the line was located within the Soviet zone of occupation, and was nationalised along with all the other railways in the zone by the Provisional People’s Committee for North Korea on 10 August 1946, becoming part of the Korean State Railway.

Services
Logs floated down the Yalu River in log rafts are loaded onto trains at Amrokkang Station, from where they are shipped to the rest of the country.

Route 

A yellow background in the "Distance" box indicates that section of the line is not electrified.

References

Railway lines in North Korea
Standard gauge railways in North Korea